Nová Lehota is a village in Nové Mesto nad Váhom District in the Trenčín Region of western Slovakia. Since 1976 it has been a part of the municipality of Handlová.

History
In historical records, the village was first mentioned in 1487. Historically, the village belongs to the Hauerland region in the Carpathian Mountains. The origins of the German settlement go as far as the 13th century when the necessity of colonization of regions devastated by the Mongolian invasion of 1240–1241 arose. During the late 13th century, there were many German habitats founded in the region by diverse German nationalities. The foundation of Neuhau is not primarily connected to the colonization after the Mongol invasion. It is being dated somehow later, maybe even more than hundred years later. It is also generally suggested that the first inhabitants of the place situated in the valley halfway from Handlová to Žiar nad Hronom in a rather hilly surrounding were actually Slavs. Supposedly there has been as much as 3 manors of the primary settlements of Slavs latter to become extinct and fully replaced by Germans from either Handlová or Janova Lehota. In 1945, the village had a population of approximately 1400 inhabitants, nearly all of them Germans. They were almost completely expelled and relocated to Germany in 1946.

Geography
The municipality lies at an altitude of 620 metres and covers an area of 18.214 km². It has a population of about 236 people.

References

External links

http://www.statistics.sk/mosmis/eng/zaklad.jsp?txtUroven=420304&lstObec=506311

Villages and municipalities in Nové Mesto nad Váhom District